Riccardo Boscolo Chio (born 6 July 2002) is an Italian professional footballer who plays as a midfielder for Serie C club Pro Sesto.

Club career
Born in Chioggia, Boscolo Chio started his career in Venezia F.C. and Inter Milan youth sector.

On 6 August 2021, he was loaned to Serie C club Imolese. Riccardo made his professional debut on 19 September 2021 against Siena.

On 20 July 2022, he joined Pro Sesto on a permanent deal.

International career
Boscolo Chio was a youth international for Italy U17 and Italy U18. He played four 2019 FIFA U-17 World Cup matches for Italy.

Career statistics

Club

References

External links
 
 

2002 births
Living people
People from Chioggia
Footballers from Veneto
Italian footballers
Association football midfielders
Serie C players
Inter Milan players
Imolese Calcio 1919 players
Italy youth international footballers
Sportspeople from the Metropolitan City of Venice